Dibromobenzene may refer to:
 1,2-Dibromobenzene (o-dibromobenzene)
 1,3-Dibromobenzene (m-dibromobenzene)
 1,4-Dibromobenzene (p-dibromobenzene)